Dawson is a township located in Rainy River District in Northwestern Ontario, Canada. The township is located at the mouth of the Rainy River where it flows into Lake of the Woods.

The township was formed on 1 January 1997, when the former incorporated townships of Atwood, Blue, Dilke, and Worthington were amalgamated.

Communities
The primary communities in the township are Blue, McGinnis Creek, Pinewood and Sleeman.

Demographics 

Climate

See also
List of townships in Ontario

References

Municipalities in Rainy River District
Single-tier municipalities in Ontario
Township municipalities in Ontario